Keetia is a genus of flowering plants in the family Rubiaceae. It consists of climbers or scrambling shrubs, rarely small trees.

Distribution
The genus has a wide distribution area and occurs in tropical and southern Africa.

Taxonomy
It was originally described by Edwin Percy Phillips in 1926 and is named after J.D.M Keet, a South African forester and plant collector. The type species was Keetia transvaalensis, which received its name from the region it was first collected, but is now included in Keetia gueinzii.

Species

 Keetia abouabou Cheek
 Keetia acuminata Bridson
 Keetia angustifolia Bridson
 Keetia bakossiorum Cheek
 Keetia bridsoniae Jongkind
 Keetia carmichaelii Bridson
 Keetia cornelia (Cham. & Schltdl.) Bridson
 Keetia ferruginea Bridson
 Keetia foetida Bridson
 Keetia futa Cheek
 Keetia gracilis Bridson
 Keetia gueinzii (Sond.) Bridson
 Keetia hispida (Benth.)Bridson
 Keetia inaequilatera (Hutch. & Dalziel) Bridson
 Keetia koritschoneri Bridson
 Keetia leucantha (K.Krause) Bridson
 Keetia lukei Bridson
 Keetia lulandensis Bridson
 Keetia mannii (Hiern) Bridson
 Keetia molundensis (K.Krause) Bridson
 Keetia multiflora (Schumach. & Thonn.) Bridson
 Keetia namoyae O.Lachenaud & Q.Luke
 Keetia obovata Jongkind
 Keetia ornata Bridson
 Keetia procteri Bridson
 Keetia purpurascens (Bullock) Bridson
 Keetia purseglovei Bridson
 Keetia ripae (De Wild.) Bridson
 Keetia rubens (Hiern) Bridson
 Keetia rufivillosa (Robyns ex Hutch. & Dalziel) Bridson
 Keetia rwandensis Bridson
 Keetia susu Cheek
 Keetia tenuiflora (Welw. ex Hiern) Bridson
 Keetia venosa (Oliv.) Bridson
 Keetia venosissima (Hutch. & Dalziel) Bridson
 Keetia zanzibarica (Klotzsch) Bridson

References

External links
World Checklist of Rubiaceae

 
Rubiaceae genera
Taxonomy articles created by Polbot
Taxa named by Edwin Percy Phillips